Belvì is a comune (municipality) in the Province of Nuoro in the Italian region Sardinia, located about  north of Cagliari and about  southwest of Nuoro. It is part of the traditional region Barbagia di Belvì.

Belvì borders the following municipalities: Aritzo, Atzara, Desulo, Meana Sardo, Sorgono, Tonara.

References

Cities and towns in Sardinia